Steven Rinkoff is a Grammy Award–winning record producer, mixer, and sound engineer, best known for his work with songwriter-producer Jim Steinman. He has worked with Steinman since 1986 on various projects, in all facets of production (production, mixing, and engineering), and is Steinman's partner in Ravenous Records, a record label.

Projects

Jim Steinman
 Bonnie Tyler, Secret Dreams and Forbidden Fire, 1986, CBS (engineer)
 The Sisters of Mercy, "More", Vision Thing, 1990, Elektra (engineer/mixer)
 Meat Loaf, Bat Out of Hell II: Back into Hell, 1993, Virgin (engineer/mixer/associate producer)
 Taylor Dayne, "Original Sin", The Shadow, 1994, Universal (recorded/co-producer)
 Watershed, Twister, 1995, Epic (producer)
 Take That, "Never Forget", Greatest Hits, 1995, RCA (recorded/co-producer)
 Bonnie Tyler, "Two Out of Three Ain't Bad" and "Making Love Out of Nothing at All", Free Spirit, 1995, EastWest (co-producer/engineer/mixer)
 Celine Dion, "It's All Coming Back to Me Now", "River Deep, Mountain High" and "Call the Man", Falling into You, 1996, Columbia (co-producer/engineer)
 Tina Arena, In Deep, 1997, Sony (producer/engineer)
 Whistle Down the Wind, cast recording of Andrew Lloyd Webber theatrical production, 1998, Uni/Decca (co-producer/engineer)
 Boyzone, Where We Belong, 1998, Polydor (mixer)
 Boyzone, "No Matter What", 1998, Polydor UK (mixer)
 Meat Loaf, The Very Best of Meat Loaf, 1998, Virgin/Sony (co-producer/engineer/mixer)
 Tanz der Vampire, theatre cast album, 1998, Polygram (co-producer/engineer)
 Marc Anthony and Tina Arena, "I Want to Spend My Lifetime Loving You", The Mask of Zorro, 1998, Sony (co-producer/engineer)
 Celine Dion, All the Way... A Decade of Song, 1999, Columbia/Epic (producer/engineer)
 Various Artists, All Time Greatest Movie Songs, 1999, Sony (producer)
 Luciano Pavarotti and Friends, Pavarotti & Friends: For Guatemala and Kosovo, 1999, Polygram (mixer)
 Boyzone, Singles Collection: 1994-1999, 2000, Polydor (mixing)
 Nicki French, "Two Out of Three Ain't Bad" and "Lovers Again", 2000, Ravenous (mixer)
 Tina Arena, Souvenirs, 2001, Sony (producer/engineer)
 Various Artists, Now and Forever: The Andrew Lloyd Webber Box Set, 2001, Polydor (producer)
 Various Artists, Andrew Lloyd Webber Definitive Hit Singles Collection, 2001, Polydor (mixer) (later reissued in 2002 as "Gold" collection)
 Opera Babes, "Aida", 2002, Sony UK (co-producer/engineer/mixer)
 Wuthering Heights, 2003, Ravenous/MTV Movies (recorded/co-producer)
 The Dream Engine, 2003–2007, Ravenous Group LLC (producer)
 Bonnie Tyler, Faster Than the Speed of Night / Secret Dreams and Forbidden Fire (double-pack), 2004, Columbia (engineer)
 The Sisters of Mercy, Merciful Release, 2007, Merciful Release (overdubs/mixer)
 Celine Dion, Falling into You / A New Day Has Come / Let's Talk About Love (three-pack), 2008, Sony (producer/engineer)
 Celine Dion, My Love: Essential Collection, 2008, Columbia/Epic (producer/engineer)
 "Tanz der Vampire": Neue Wiener Fassung, theatre cast album, 2009, Hit Squad (producer/recorder/mixer)
 Dans der Vampieren, theatre cast album, 2010, MVV (producer)
 Bat Out of Hell The Musical, Original Cast Recording, 2017, BOOH Label (producer)

Other
 Kid Creole and the Coconuts, Doppelganger, 1983, Ze (engineer)
 Billy Idol, Rebel Yell, 1983, Chrysalis (engineer)
 Marcus Miller, Marcus Miller, 1984, Warner Bros. (assistant)
 The Power Station, The Power Station, 1985, Parlophone/EMI/Capitol (engineer)
 Al Jarreau, Live in London, 1985, Warner Bros. (engineer)
 Robert Palmer, Riptide, 1985, Island (engineer)
 Paul McCartney, Press to Play, 1986, Parlophone/EMI/Capitol (engineer/mixer)
 Steve Winwood, Back in the High Life, 1986, Island (engineer)
 Tina Turner, Break Every Rule, 1986, Capitol (engineer)
 Journey, Raised on Radio, 1986, Columbia (engineer)
 Lone Justice, Shelter, 1986, Geffen (engineer)
 The Jitters, The Jitters, 1987, Capitol/Canada (engineer/mixer)
 Little Steven, Freedom - No Compromise, 1987, Manhattan (engineer)
 Warlock, Triumph and Agony, 1987, Vertigo/Polygram (mixer)
 The Brandos, Honor Among Thieves, 1987, Relativity (mixer)
 They Eat Their Own, "Video Martyr", They Eat Their Own, 1987, Relativity (mixer)
 Motörhead, "On the Road", 1980's, GWR (mixer)
 Platinum Blonde, Contact, 1987, CBS/Canada (mixer)
 4 Reasons Unknown, 4 Reasons Unknown, 1988, Epic (engineer)
 Til Tuesday, Everything's Different Now, 1988, Epic (engineer)
 Married to the Mob, 1988, Orion Pictures (music production)
 The Feelies, Only Life, 1988, A&M (producer/engineer)
 The Fat Boys, "Are You Ready For Freddy", A Nightmare on Elm Street 4: The Dream Master, 1988, Tin Pan Apple (mixer)
 Rod Stewart, "Lost in You" (12" version), Out of Order, 1988, Warner Brothers (mixer)
 The Bangles, "I'll Set You Free," Everything, 1988, Columbia (engineer)
 Face to Face, One Big Day, 1988, Polygram (engineer/mixer)
 John Zorn, Spy vs Spy: The Music of Ornette Coleman, 1988, Elektra/Musician (engineer)
 Joe Henry, Murder of Crows, 1989, Coyote/A&M (mixer)
 Paul McCartney, Flowers in the Dirt, 1989, Parlophone/EMI/Capitol (engineer)
 The Grapes of Wrath, Now and Again, 1989, Capitol/Canada (mixer)
 Phoebe Snow, Something Real, 1989, Elektra (engineer/mixer)
 George Benson, Tenderly, 1989, Warner Bros. (engineer)
 The Golden Palominos, A Dead Horse, 1989, Celluloid (engineer/mixer)
 Tom Cochrane and Red Rider, The Symphony Sessions, 1989, LP/Capitol (producer/mixer)
 Jodi Bongiovi, Jodi Bongiovi, 1989, Capitol (engineer/mixer)
 Eric Clapton, Journeyman, 1989, Reprise (engineer)
 Luba, All or Nothing, 1989, Capitol/Canada (mixer)
 The Brandos, Trial By Fire, 1990, BMG (engineer/mixer)
 Regatta, Regatta, 1990, BMG/Canada (engineer/mixer)
 The Bangles, Greatest Hits, 1990, Sony/Columbia (engineer)
 Derek and the Dominos, The Layla Sessions: 20th Anniversary Edition, 1990, Polygram (mixer)
 Simon Shaheen, The Music of Mohamed Abdel Wahab, 1990, Axiom (engineer)
 Various Artists, Illuminations: An Axiom Compilation, 1991, Axiom (engineer)
 Belinda Carlisle, Live Your Life Be Free, 1991, MCA/Virgin (engineer)
 N Motion, N/Motion, 1991, Warner Bros. (mixer)
 Too Much Joy, Cereal Killers, 1991, Giant/Warner Bros. Records (engineer)
 Squeeze, Play, 1991, Warner Bros. (engineer)
 The Brandos, "The Solution," Gunfire At Midnight, 1992, SPV (mixer)
 The Golden Palominos, History (1982-1985), 1992, Enigma/Restless (engineer/mixer)
 Gregg Alexander, Intoxifornication, 1992, Epic/Sony (producer/engineer)
 Helix, Back for Another Taste, 1993, Castle (engineer/mixer)
 The Feelies, "Higher Ground" (single), 1993, A&M (producer)
 The Velvet Underground, What Goes On, 1993, Raven (engineer)
 Axiom Funk, Funkcronomicon, 1995, Axiom (engineer)
 Phish, A Live One, 1995, Elektra (technical consultant)
 Various Artists, New Hits '96, 1996, Alex (engineer/assoc. producer)
 Eric Clapton, Blues, 1999, Polygram (mixer)
 George Benson, George Benson Anthology, 2000, Rhino (engineer)
 Belinda Carlisle, Original Gold, 2000, Disky (engineer)
 Alex Skolnick Trio, Last Day in Paradise, 2007, Magnatude (mixer)
 Mick Jagger, The Very Best of Mick Jagger, 2007, Atlantic/Rhino (engineer)

References
 Steve Rinkoff at Discogs

Year of birth missing (living people)
Living people
American record producers
Grammy Award winners
Place of birth missing (living people)